The World Group II was the second highest level of Fed Cup competition in 2012. Winners advanced to the World Group Play-offs, and the losing nations advancing to the World Group II Play-offs.

United States vs. Belarus

Japan vs. Slovenia

Slovakia vs. France

Switzerland vs. Australia

References

See also
Fed Cup structure

World Group II